Cancajanag is located within the municipal boundary of Dagami in the province of Leyte, on the island of Leyte, Region VIII, of the Philippines. It is loated within the baranggays of Bouglayor and San Agustin.

Physical features

Cancajanag is classified by Philippine volcanologists as a potentially active dome complex volcano with an elevation of 900 meters and a base diameter of 4 kilometres. It is one of the 18 volcanoes in the province.

It has a hot spring, Mainit Spring (Anahawan) with a temperature range of 63.4 °C to 63.9 °C,

Adjacent Volcanic Edifices are Alto Peak which is 6.2 cadastral km NNW of Cancajanag, and Lobi which is 6.6 cadastral km SSE of Cancajanag.

Predominant rock type is andesite.

See also
List of active volcanoes in the Philippines
List of potentially active volcanoes in the Philippines
List of inactive volcanoes in the Philippines
Philippine Institute of Volcanology and Seismology

References

External links
Philippine Institute of Volcanology and Seismology (PHIVOLCS) Cancajanag Page

Volcanoes of Leyte
Potentially active volcanoes of the Philippines
Landforms of Leyte (province)
Pleistocene lava domes